Cnemaspis punctatonuchalis, also known as the spotted-neck rock gecko, is a species of gecko endemic to central Thailand.

References

punctatonuchalis
Reptiles of Thailand
Endemic fauna of Thailand
Reptiles described in 2010
Taxa named by Larry Lee Grismer
Taxa named by Kirati Kunya
Taxa named by Olivier Sylvain Gérard Pauwels
Taxa named by Jesse L. Grismer
Taxa named by Perry L. Wood